Off-farm (non-farm) income refers to the portion of farm household income obtained off the farm, including nonfarm wages and salaries, pensions, and interest income earned by farm families. On average for all farms in the United States, off-farm income accounts for over 90% of farm operator household income.

See also

Farm income
Gross farm income

References 

Agriculture in the United States
Agricultural economics